Hajjiabad (also Romanized as Ḩājjīābād) is a village in Khorrami Rural District, in the Central District of Khorrambid County, Fars Province, Iran. At the 2006 census, its population was 123, in 31 families.

References 

Populated places in Khorrambid County